Thierry Perreux (born 4 March 1963 in Soisy-sous-Montmorency, Val-d'Oise) is a French handball player who competed in the 1992 Summer Olympics.

In 1992 he was a member of the French handball team which won the bronze medal. He played six matches and scored eight goals.

External links
profile

1963 births
Living people
People from Soisy-sous-Montmorency
French male handball players
Olympic handball players of France
Handball players at the 1992 Summer Olympics
Olympic bronze medalists for France
Olympic medalists in handball
Medalists at the 1992 Summer Olympics
Sportspeople from Val-d'Oise